Below is a list of places of worship in Harrogate, North Yorkshire by denomination.

Baptist
Harrogate Baptist Church

Church of England   
 
Christ Church, High Harrogate   
St. Aidan's High School Chapel 
St. James' Church, Birstwith
St. John's Church, Bilton   
St. Luke's Church   
St. Mark's Church, Harrogate
St. Mary's Church, Harrogate, now known as Kairos Church
St. Peter's Church, Harrogate   
St. Robert's Church, Pannal
St. Wilfrid's Church, Harrogate

Methodist
   
The Methodist churches in Harrogate are all part of the Nidd Valley Circuit in the Yorkshire North and East District, formerly (before 2017) part of the Leeds District.
Bilton Area Methodist Church 
Harlow Hill Methodist Church 
Killinghall Methodist Church, Ripon Road 
Pannal Methodist Church 
Starbeck Methodist Church   
Trinity Methodist   
Wesley Chapel 
Woodlands Methodist Church 

The former Wesleyan Chapel on Grove Road, now a guest house, is a Grade II listed Italianate building, dating from 1896.

Roman Catholic   
   
St. Aelred's Church, 71 Woodlands Drive   
St. Joseph's Church   
St. Robert's Church

United Reformed
Bilton Grange URC, Woodfield Road, founded in 1906 as a 'Church Plant' from Victoria Avenue Congregational Church, with services initially held in temporary premises on Skipton Road now known as the "Jehovah's Witnesses Hall".
St. Paul's Church, Victoria Avenue   
West Park United Reformed Church, Harrogate

Other
Christadelphians, Pannal Memorial Hall, Station Road 
Harrogate District Hospital Chapel. The chapel is located on the ground floor of Harrogate District Hospital, near Littondale Ward.
Harrogate Elim Church, Park View. An Elim Pentecostal Church, the church has been meeting in Harrogate since 1952 and is part of the Elim Foursquare Gospel Alliance.
Harrogate Hebrew Congregation (Harrogate Shul), St Mary's Walk. The first Harrogate synagogue was established in 1918, using rooms over an antique shop in the Montpelier Quarter. The community moved to the current site (a former church school building) in 1925. The present building was opened in 1968.
Harrogate New Life Church
Latter Day Saints Chapel, Wetherby Road
Life Destiny Church
Mayfield Community Church
Society of Friends Meeting House, Queen Parade

References

 
Harrogate
Places